Robin Hood and the Ranger is catalogued as Child ballad 131 and Roud Folk Song Index No. 933.

Synopsis

Robin Hood, going out to hunt deer, meets a forester who forbids him.  They fight.  Robin is beaten, and blows his horn, summoning his men.  He offers to make him one of their company, and they hold a feast.

References

Child Ballads
Robin Hood ballads